Eger-Yurd was a village in the Kalbajar District of Azerbaijan.

This village came under the occupation of the self-proclaimed Nagorno-Karabakh Republic during the First Nagorno-Karabakh War. It was returned to Azerbaijan on 25 November 2020 per the 2020 Nagorno-Karabakh ceasefire agreement.

References
 

Populated places in Kalbajar District
Abolished villages in Kalbajar District